Assembly is a non-profit museum in Monticello, New York featuring the work of 21st century international artists created by Bosco Sodi. It is housed in a former Buick dealership. The 23,000 square foot space has been updated by architect Alberto Kalach.

References

External links
 

Sullivan County, New York
Museums established in 2022
Museums in New York (state)
Art museums and galleries in New York (state)